Ordnance Clothing Factory is an Indian clothing manufacturing company run by the Ordnance Factories Board, Government of India.

About the Factory

This organisation comes under Indian Ordnance Factories, which in turn comes under the aegis of Ordnance Factory Board  (OFB), having its headquarters in Kolkata. All these organisation come under the control of Ministry of Defence, Government of India.

The factory more particularly is controlled by Ordnance Equipment Factories Group having its headquarters at Kanpur, Uttar Pradesh, India, which itself is a key operating division under Ordnance Factory Board (OFB).

Among the approximately forty factories under Indian Ordnance Factories, there are two Ordnance Clothing Factories. The Ordnance Clothing Factory at Avadi (OCFAV), near Chennai and Ordnance Clothing Factory at Shahjahanpur (OCFS), near Bareilly, Uttar Pradesh.

Production

The Factory at Avadi, Chennai produces combat shirts, combat jackets, trousers, shorts, tents, disposable shirts and parachutes for the Defence Forces. OCFAV recently started production of bullet proof jackets and bullet proof vests.

The Factory at Shahjahanpur, Uttar Pradesh produces winter clothing, high altitude clothing, uniforms, blankets, woollen knitwear and mosquito nets for the Defence Forces.

References

External links
http://ofbindia.nic.in/index.php?wh=aboutus&lang=en
https://web.archive.org/web/20150209130610/http://ofbindia.nic.in/units/index.php?unit=oefc&page=about&lang=en

Defence companies of India
Ministry of Defence (India)
Clothing companies of India
Companies based in Kolkata
Companies with year of establishment missing